Mili Avital is an Israeli actress. She built an international career, starting in her native Israel, starring on stage, film and television. She won the Israeli Academy Award for Best Supporting Actress in 1991, moved to New York in 1993 to study theater in English, was discovered by an agent while working in a restaurant, and started acting in Hollywood almost immediately. She has maintained her career in both countries since.

Early life 
Avital was born in Jerusalem, the daughter of graphic designers Noni and Iko Avital. Both her parents are Sephardic Jews; Avital's father was born in Morocco, whereas her mother is Israeli-born and of Turkish-Jewish descent. She was raised in Tel Aviv, Israel, and in Ra'anana, Israel. She attended the Thelma Yellin High School of Arts in Givatayim, Israel.

American career 
In 1993 she arrived in New York City to study acting at the Circle in the Square Theatre School. The following year, discovered by an agent while working as a waitress, she was cast as the female lead in the 1994 science fiction film Stargate, for which she received a Sci-fi Universe award. She has appeared in films such as Jim Jarmusch's Dead Man opposite Johnny Depp, Doug Ellin's Kissing a Fool opposite David Schwimmer, Polish Wedding opposite Claire Danes, and Robert Benton's The Human Stain opposite Anthony Hopkins. In 1999, she portrayed a Bosnian rape victim in the pilot episode of the long-running NBC legal drama, Law & Order: Special Victims Unit. Avital appeared in three other episodes of the series: "Parasites", "Manhattan Vigil", and "Depravity Standard". She also appeared in the Law & Order: Criminal Intent episode "Palimpsest". Her television work includes Scheherazade in the Emmy-nominated ABC miniseries Arabian Nights to rave reviews, Jon Avnet's Uprising, and After the Storm . In 2009–2010 Avital appeared in the FX TV show Damages, in a recurring role as the mistress to the husband of Patty Hewes (Glenn Close). She appeared in the 2012 ABC television series 666 Park Avenue.

Filmography

Film

Television

References

External links 
 

20th-century Israeli actresses
21st-century Israeli actresses
Actresses from Jerusalem
Circle in the Square Theatre School alumni
Israeli emigrants to the United States
Israeli film actresses
Israeli people of Moroccan-Jewish descent
Israeli people of Turkish-Jewish descent
Israeli Sephardi Jews
Israeli stage actresses
Jewish Israeli actresses
Living people
Ophir Award Winners
Thelma Yellin High School of Arts alumni
Year of birth missing (living people)